Nenadi Esther Usman (born 12 November 1966) is a Nigerian politician from Kagoro in Kaduna State, Nigeria. She was elected senator for Kaduna South in the April 2011 elections, running on the People's Democratic Party (PDP) platform.

Early career

Usman began her education in Jos, then later Kagoro, after which she attended the Federal Government College, Jos, Plateau State.  She later acquired her first degree in Geography at Ahmadu Bello University, Zaria and later a postgraduate diploma from University of Jos.  She was the managing director of Dana Ventures then later executive adviser in Kaduna State in 1992. She was also the executive adviser in 1993 then the principal personnel officer FCDA from 1994 to 1998

Usman has played a major role in women empowerment as she had a pivotal role in the formation of an NGO called "Education and Empowerment for women" with its headquarters at Jere in Kaduna State and she is the present chairperson of the Coalition of N.G.O's for Women Development in Kaduna State. She is married with four children.

Political career

She has served as a member Kaduna State caucus of the defunct National Republican Convention (NRC). She was also a member-elect of the House of Representatives, representing Kachia/Kagarko Federal Constituency under the United Nigeria Congress Party in 1998.  She was appointed commissioner in Kaduna State from 1999 to 2002, then commissioner for environment & natural resources in the state in 2002 and later commissioner for health from 2002 to 2003.

She was the coordinator Alh. Ahmed Makarfi Campaign team in 1999 and she was re-elected campaign committee chairman in 2003. She was the coordinator Kaduna State Chief Olusegun Obasanjo Campaign Committee.

She was appointed the minister of state for finance and later the minister of finance by the Obasanjo administration.

She was elected senator for Kaduna South in the April 2011 elections, running on the People's Democratic Party (PDP) platform. The Action Congress of Nigeria (ACN) disputed the result. As senator, she has pushed for the government to give more attention to women and children, who she calls the most vulnerable members of society.

Personal life 
Nenadi was married to Dr. Sa’ad Usman, the Emir of Jere in Kaduna state who died in the year 2020.

References

External links
 Official website

Living people
Finance ministers of Nigeria
University of Jos alumni
National Republican Convention politicians
United Nigeria Congress Party politicians
Members of the House of Representatives (Nigeria)
Peoples Democratic Party members of the Senate (Nigeria)
20th-century Nigerian women politicians
20th-century Nigerian politicians
21st-century Nigerian women politicians
21st-century Nigerian politicians
Women government ministers of Nigeria
Female finance ministers
1966 births